Tan Xinpei (23 April 1847 – 10 May 1917) was a Chinese Peking opera artist who specialized in sheng roles. A disciple of Cheng Changgeng, Tan Xinpei was undoubtedly the most important Peking opera performer of his generation. Some of his audio recordings have survived. He was also the only actor in China's earliest film Dingjun Mountain (1905).

More than 40 of his family members have, over seven generations, worked as Peking opera performers, including his son Tan Xiaopei, grandson Tan Fuying, great-grandson Tan Yuanshou, and great-great-grandson Tan Xiaozeng.

In popular culture
In the 1993 TV series Niu Zihou and Fu Lian Cheng (牛子厚與富連成), Tan Xinpei is portrayed by Peking opera artist Li Fuchun (李甫春). In the 2000 film Shadow Magic, the character Tan Linmei is clearly based on Tan Xinpei. He is played by Peking opera artist Li Yusheng (李玉声). In the 2005 film Dingjun Mountain (定軍山), Tan Xinpei is portrayed by his great-grandson Tan Yuanshou, Tan Fuying's son and a notable Peking opera artist in his own right.

References

Chinese male Peking opera actors
Chinese male silent film actors
Male actors from Wuhan
Singers from Hubei
19th-century Chinese male actors
19th-century Chinese male singers
20th-century Chinese male actors
1847 births
1917 deaths
20th-century Chinese  male  singers